This is a list of punk blues musicians and musical groups.

#
 '68 Comeback
 8 Eyed Spy

A
 Andre Williams

B
 Bantam Rooster
 Band of Skulls
 Scott H. Biram
 Beasts of Bourbon
 Benjamin Booker
 Big John Bates
 The Black Keys
 Bob Log III
 Boss Hog
 Brimstone Howl

C
 Cheater Slicks
 Billy Childish
 The Chrome Cranks
 Clutch
 Compulsive Gamblers
 The Cows
 The Cramps

D
 Deadboy & the Elephantmen
 The Delta 72
 Chris Desjardins
 The Dicks
 Dzukele

F
 The Flesh Eaters

G
 The Gaslight Anthem
 The Gits
 The Gories
 The Gun Club
 Guitar Wolf

H
 Heavy Trash
 Hillstomp
 Highly Suspect
 Honeymoon in Red
 Rowland S. Howard

I
 The Immortal Lee County Killers
 Inca Babies

J
Jeffrey Lee Pierce
 The Jim Jones Revue
Jack White
Jon Spencer Blues Explosion
Jack O'Fire

K
 Kid Congo Powers
 The Kills
 Knoxville Girls

L
 Laughing Hyenas
 Left Lane Cruiser
 Legendary Shack Shakers
 Bob Log III
 Love Hunters

M
 The Mess Hall
 Modey Lemon
 Mule

N
 New York Dolls
 Napalm Beach

O
 Oblivians

P
 Partibrejkers
 Pussy Galore
 PJ Harvey

R
 Railroad Jerk
 Rollins Band
 Rose Hill Drive

S
 Kim Salmon
 The Scientists
 Jim Sclavunos
 Sister Double Happiness
 Screaming Females
 Social Distortion
 Soledad Brothers

T
 Tav Falco's Panther Burns
 Tex & the Horseheads
T.S.O.L.

U
 The Upholsterers

V
 The Von Bondies

W
 The White Stripes

See also
Cowpunk
Garage punk
Roots rock
Swamp rock

Lists of punk bands
Lists of blues musicians